Mohamed Dahalani (born January 1, 1917 in Moroni, Comoros, and died July 24, 1981 in Bagneux, France) was a politician from Comoros who served in the French National Assembly from 1970-1978.

References 
Page on the French National Assembly website

1917 births
1981 deaths
People from Moroni, Comoros
Comorian politicians
Union of Democrats for the Republic politicians
Deputies of the 4th National Assembly of the French Fifth Republic
Deputies of the 5th National Assembly of the French Fifth Republic
Comorian expatriates in France